Tamaiti Williams is a New Zealand rugby union player who plays for the Canterbury in the Mitre 10 Cup competition. His position of choice is Prop.

Canterbury 
Williams made his debut for Canterbury in Round 1 of the 2020 Mitre 10 Cup against North Harbour at QBE Stadium, Albany in North Harbour.

Crusaders
He was named in the Crusaders squad for the 2021 Super Rugby Aotearoa season.

Maori All Blacks
On the 24th of November Maori All Black Coach Clayton McMillan named his squad to play Moana Pasific on the 5th of December which included Tamati for the first time and he was the youngest in the team.

References

External links

New Zealand rugby union players
Living people
Canterbury rugby union players
Rugby union props
People educated at Saint Kentigern College
2000 births
Rugby union players from Perth, Western Australia
Crusaders (rugby union) players
Māori All Blacks players
Rugby union players from Whangārei